Race Car Blues is the third studio album by Australian rock band Slowly Slowly, released through UNFD on 28 February 2020.

The album debuted and peaked at number seven on the ARIA Albums Chart.

At the AIR Awards of 2021, the album was nominated for Best Independent Rock Album or EP.

Background 
Race Car Blues features the previously-released tracks "Jellyfish", "Creature of Habit Pt.2", "Safety Switch", "Low", title track "Race Car Blues" and "19", and was recorded throughout 2019 at Salt Studios in Melbourne. The album was engineered by the band's bass guitarist Alex Quayle.

Release and promotion 
Race Car Blues was released by UNFD on 28 February 2020, as digital download, CD, and LP formats.

Track listing
All tracks are written and performed by Slowly Slowly, except "Safety Switch" which is also performed by Bec Stevens.

Personnel

Musicians
 Ben Stewart – writing, lead vocals and guitar 
 Patrick Murphy – writing, drums 
 Albert Doan – writing, guitar 
 Alex Quayle – writing, bass 

Other musicians
 Bec Stevens – vocals

Technical
 Alex Quayle – engineering

Charts

Tour 
Slowly Slowly announced a tour in support of the album on 28 January 2020, with dates across Australia throughout April and May 2020. This was later confirmed to include appearances at the now-cancelled Groovin the Moo 2020 festival.

Due to the COVID-19 pandemic, the band announced on 19 March 2020 that the tour had been postponed, with their headline shows changed to occur in October and November 2020. The rescheduled dates include appearances in Brisbane, Sydney, Melbourne, Hobart, Launceston, Perth and Adelaide. Groovin the Moo was cancelled.

References

2020 albums
Slowly Slowly (band) albums
UNFD albums